The 2008 Motor City Bowl was a National Collegiate Athletic Association bowl game in which the Florida Atlantic Owls defeated the Central Michigan Chippewas 24–21.  It was played on December 26, 2008 at Ford Field in Detroit, Michigan and aired on ESPN.  The underdog FAU team from the Sun Belt Conference was led by game Most Valuable Player Rusty Smith.  CMU had finished in third place in the West Division of the Mid-American Conference.

The game was the 12th installment of the Motor City Bowl and was attended by 41,399 people, the fourth-lowest all time for the Motor City Bowl.

Scoring summary

References 

Motor City Bowl
Little Caesars Pizza Bowl
Florida Atlantic Owls football bowl games
Central Michigan Chippewas football bowl games
December 2008 sports events in the United States
2008 in sports in Michigan
2008 in Detroit